Saleh Al-Ghwinem  (born March 31, 1986) is a Saudi football player who plays a wigner.

References
http://www.slstat.com/spl2010-2011ar/player.php?id=192

1986 births
Living people
People from Khobar
Saudi Arabian footballers
Ittihad FC players
Al-Qadsiah FC players
Al-Raed FC players
Al-Hazem F.C. players
Al-Diriyah Club players
Al-Thoqbah Club players
Place of birth missing (living people)
Saudi First Division League players
Saudi Second Division players
Saudi Professional League players
Association football wingers